Frederick James Andrew (29 May 1937 – 14 July 1996) was an English cricketer who played for Gloucestershire. He made his first-class debut against Middlesex, and also played two List A matches. A fast-medium bowler, he made his first-class debut against Middlesex in 1959. He also played two List A matches in the Gillette Cup in 1966.

Andrew was always regarded as a bowler; in both forms of the game, he failed to score more than six runs in an innings. However, he did score 29 against Worcestershire Second XI for Gloucestershire Second XI, for whom he took 111 wickets in 55 matches.

His finest first-class appearance was against Kent in May 1962, when he took 5 wickets for just 8 runs in the Kent first innings. Andrew played his last first-class match in 1963, but was a regular of the Second XI until 1965, played in the 1966 Gillette Cup, and played three further Second XI matches in 1968, 1969 and 1972. He ended his career having taken 57 first-class wickets at a respectable average of 23.96.

When he left Gloucestershire he took over from ex England and Gloucestershire player Reg Sinfield as the cricket professional at Clifton College. He guided both Matthew Windows and James Kirtley to the highest levels of the game. Andrews was a much loved 'pro' who was famous for the 'care' and attention he showed the Close; the college playing field of 'Breathless Hush' fame. Anyone daring to set foot on any area of the outfield or wicket, in winter or summer was met with a piercing whistle, followed by a shout of "get off my... square".

References

English cricketers
Gloucestershire cricketers
1937 births
1996 deaths
Cricketers from Bristol